Note

References